Rewind: Deja Screw is the debut studio album by American Queensbridge hip hop emcee Blaq Poet since 1991's Without A Warning together with producer DJ Hot Day. Released on March 21, 2006 through Traffic Entertainment, the album features a mix of old and new verses by Poet over all new beats, hence the title. The three main producers are 45 Scientific from France, DJ Premier, and Blaq Poet himself, although Easy Mo Bee and The Alchemist both contribute a track each. Poet's cousin, KL, who died in early 2008, makes three appearances on the LP.

Track listing

2006 albums
Albums produced by DJ Premier
Albums produced by Easy Mo Bee
Albums produced by the Alchemist (musician)
Blaq Poet albums